Chalakudy taluk comes under Irinjalakuda Revenue Division of Thrissur district in  Kerala, India. It is one of the 77 taluks of Kerala. Chalakudy taluk was formed in the year 2013 by the UDF Government, led by Oommen Chandy. 31 villages from the former subdistrict of Mukundapuram taluk form the new subdistrict.

Alathur
Aloor
Annallur
Athirappally
Elanjipra
Kakkulissery
Kallettumkara (CT)
Kallur Thekkummuri (CT)
Kallur Vadakkummuri (CT)
Kizhakke chalakkudy
Kizhakkummuri
Kodakara
Kodassery
Kuruvilassery
Kuttichira
Maringoor thekkummuri
Mattathur
Melur
Mupliyam
Muringur Vadakkummuri (CT)
Nandipulam
Padinjare Chalakkudy
Pariyaram
Perambra
Potta
Thazhakkadu
Thirumukkulam
Vadakkumbhagom
Vadama (CT)
Varandarappilly
Vellikulangara

History
Up to AD 1762 Chalakudy and surrounding areas were part of Kodassery nadu. In 1762AD Cochin Maharajah formed Kodassery taluk by adding some other desoms from nearby nadus. In 1860 AD this taluk was abolished and parts were amalgamated into Mukundapuram and Kanayannur taluks. In December 2013 new Chalakudy taluk was formed by bifurcating Mukundapuram Taluk.

References 

Taluks of Kerala